Fundão is a city and a municipality in the Castelo Branco District in Portugal. Fundão proper is an old city with 8,369 inhabitants in 2001, situated at the point where the slope of the Gardunha range meets the Cova da Beira plains, 500 metres above sea level. The municipality population in 2021 was 26,509. The area size is 700.20 km². The city of Covilhã is about 20 kilometers to the north by road. The municipality of Fundão is subdivided into 23 civil parishes known as freguesias in Portuguese.

History
During the Iron Age, from about 1000 B.C. until its destruction by the Romans, there was a Celtic Lusitanian Castro or fortified village in nearby São Brás Mount. The remains of a villa or agricultural manor house, workers houses and other associated buildings from the time of the Roman Empire have been found in the underground of the centre of the current city. This villa was rebuilt as a fortified medieval mansion during the High Middle Ages.

The history of Fundão is intimately related to that of its originally Jewish, then New Christian or Marrano, population.

Although the place was already mentioned in documents from 1307 referring 32 houses, the bulk of the population only settled after the 1492 Expulsion of the Jews from Spain by Ferdinand and Isabella, mainly Spanish Jews (sephardic). Close to the border, and already home to significant Jewish minorities the Cova da Beira region, the region received many refugees. They settled in the community of Fundão, which their numbers swelled to that of a city. The influx of Jewish artisans and merchants quickly transformed it into an important commercial and industrial center. With the establishment of the Portuguese Inquisition shortly thereafter, many Jews and New Christians were arrested, tortured, executed or had their possessions expropriated. The commercial dynamism of the city was affected.

The place was proclaimed a city in 1580 by its notables, after support for their attempt was declared by Dom António, Prior do Crato, to preserve Portuguese independence against the ambitions of King Philip II of Spain (Philip I of Portugal). The Municipal Council and autonomy were granted in 1747.

During the Enlightenment of the late 18th century, under the rule of Marquis of Pombal, the Prime-Minister of Portugal, legal restraints on the New Christians were abolished and rights equiparated to those of the Old Christians. Pombal tried to recreate the industrial preëminence of Fundão by founding the Royal Factories (today known as the City Hall). These efforts allowed a measure of revival to the wool industries of the city, and cloth was again exported to northern Europe. The city decayed again after its sack during the defeated Napoleonic French invasions of Portugal, and the subsequent Civil War between supporters of the Liberal Constitutionalist D. Pedro and his brother Conservative Absolutist D. Miguel, who were competing for the throne.

The film festival IMAGO – Young Film and Video Festival was organized in Fundão from 1999 to 2009.

Climate
Fundão has a Mediterranean climate (Köppen: Csa) with cool, rainy winters and hot, dry summers.

Parishes

Administratively, the municipality is divided into 23 civil parishes (freguesias):

 Alcaide
 Alcaria
 Alcongosta
 Alpedrinha
 Barroca
 Bogas de Cima
 Capinha
 Castelejo
 Castelo Novo
 Enxames
 Fatela
 Fundão, Valverde, Donas, Aldeia de Joanes e Aldeia Nova do Cabo
 Janeiro de Cima e Bogas de Baixo
 Lavacolhos
 Orca
 Pêro Viseu
 Póvoa de Atalaia e Atalaia do Campo
 Silvares
 Soalheira
 Souto da Casa
 Telhado
 Três Povos
 Vale de Prazeres e Mata da Rainha

Economy

The town is an important local center of industry and services. Around it lies some of the most fertile land in the region, in a large valley (Cova da Beira) between the Gardunha and Estrela ranges, where the Zêzere River starts its way towards the Tagus. The most significant productions are cherries, peaches, olive oil, wine, wood pulp and vegetables.

Some of the most important wolframite mines in the world (a mineral source for the element tungsten) are explored within its municipal limits. Other important mines extract lead and tin. The Panasqueira is the generic name for a set of mining operations between Cabeço do Pião in Fundão Municipality and the village of Panasqueira in the neighboring municipality of Covilhã, which operated in a technically integrated manner and continue practically since its discovery. High quality mineral water is also bottled from several sources in the municipality of Fundão.

The Cavleiro tree is a common trade item from this region. It is used in everyday products such as wooden dolls, shoes and bedposts.

Notable people 

 Jorge da Costa (1406 in Alpedrinha – 1508) a cardinal, often called the Cardinal of Alpedrinha
 Antonio Fernandez Carvajal (ca.1590 – 1659) a Portuguese-Jewish merchant, the first endenizened English Jew.
 José da Cunha Taborda (1766-1836) a Portuguese painter and architect.
 João Franco (1855 in Alcaide – 1929) a politician, minister and 47th Prime Minister of Portugal, 1906-1908
 Eugénio de Andrade (1923 in Póvoa de Atalaia – 2005) a Portuguese poet.
 Celeste Rodrigues (1923–2018) a Portuguese fadista, a fado singer.
 Pedro Carvalho (born 1985) a Portuguese actor, grew up in Fundão.

References

External links

Municipality official website

Cities in Portugal
Populated places in Castelo Branco District
Municipalities of Castelo Branco District
People from Fundão, Portugal